Frederic Berthold (born 3 June 1991) is an Austrian World Cup alpine ski racer. Berthold specializes in the speed events of Downhill and Super-G, and also competes in the combined event.

Career
Berthold made his World Cup debut at age 19 in February 2011 in Bulgaria at Bansko and finished thirtieth in the combined. He made his first podium in January 2017 in the combined at Wengen.

World Cup results

Season standings

Race podiums
 1 podium – (1 SC); 1 top ten

References

External links

Frederic Berthold World Cup standings at the International Ski Federation
 
 Frederic Berthold  at Austrian Ski team official site 

Living people
1991 births
Austrian male alpine skiers